Anciano (Spanish for old man) is an EP by the Japanese doom metal band Corrupted. Because the Spanish phrase "Horrible: El Tren Lo Partió En Dos!" ("Horrible: The Train Cut Him In Two") appears on the cover, the phrase is often mistaken to be the title of the EP. The album was pressed four times on 7-inch vinyl; the first two using a black and white cover, the third  blue, and the fourth  brown. "The Post War Dream" is a cover of the Pink Floyd song that opens their 1983 album The Final Cut.

Track listing

References

Corrupted (band) EPs
1995 EPs